Ingolfiellidae is a family of amphipod crustaceans, comprising the following genera:
Ingolfiella Hansen, 1903
Proleleupia Vonk & Schram, 2003
Rapaleleupia Vonk & Schram, 2007
Stygobarnardia Ruffo, 1985
Trogloleleupia Ruffo, 1974

References

Ingolfiellidea
Crustacean families